Coddington is a place in Derbyshire, England. It is part of the civil parish of Crich, and is ½ mile west of that village. According to Kelly's Directory of 1891 there were two farms at Coddington.

References

Hamlets in Derbyshire
Geography of Amber Valley